Robert Porter was an English footballer who played in The Football League for Blackburn Rovers.

Robert Porter made one appearance for  Blackburn Rovers in The Football League. He came into the Rovers team on 27 October 1888 at Leamington Road, Blackburn, the then home of Blackburn Rovers for their match with Stoke. According to the press reports of the time (as quoted in the Metcalf book) the match was of poor quality with many mistakes but Rovers overwhelmed Stoke in a 5–2 victory. In the match reports Porter' performance wasn't mentioned. Porter never played League football again and his history after this match was not recorded.

References

English footballers
Blackburn Rovers F.C. players
English Football League players
Association football forwards
Year of birth missing
Year of death missing